The 1960 football season was São Paulo's 31st season since club's existence.

Overall

{|class="wikitable"
|-
|Games played ||  72 (9 Torneio Rio-São Paulo, 34 Campeonato Paulista, 29 Friendly match)
|-
|Games won || 32 (2 Torneio Rio-São Paulo, 13 Campeonato Paulista, 17 Friendly match)
|-
|Games drawn || 18 (3 Torneio Rio-São Paulo, 11 Campeonato Paulista, 4 Friendly match)
|-
|Games lost || 22 (4 Torneio Rio-São Paulo, 10 Campeonato Paulista, 8 Friendly match)
|-
|Goals scored || 150
|-
|Goals conceded || 107
|-
|Goal difference || +43
|-
|Best result || 7–1 (A) v Mirassol - Friendly match - 1960.06.29  7–1 (H) v Taubaté - Campeonato Paulista - 1960.10.05
|-
|Worst result || 2–7 (A) v Fluminense - Torneio Rio-São Paulo - 1960.03.20
|-
|Most appearances || 
|-
|Top scorer || 
|-

Friendlies

Official competitions

Torneio Rio-São Paulo

Record

Campeonato Paulista

Record

External links
official website 

Association football clubs 1960 season
1960
1960 in Brazilian football